Osman Mert (born 28 January 1948) is a Turkish weightlifter. He competed in the men's middle heavyweight event at the 1972 Summer Olympics.

References

External links
 

1948 births
Living people
Turkish male weightlifters
Olympic weightlifters of Turkey
Weightlifters at the 1972 Summer Olympics
Place of birth missing (living people)
20th-century Turkish people